KFRE-CA was a low-power Class A television station licensed to Tulare, California, but serving Bakersfield per Special Temporary Authority (STA). Under the terms of the STA, the station, while licensed to broadcast in analog on UHF channel 40, actually broadcast on channel 27, having been displaced by the DTV companion channel for Fresno PBS member station KVPT. Founded November 19, 1992, KFRE-CA was an independent station owned by Pappas Telecasting Companies, with Harry J Pappas as its licensee.

The station's license was cancelled and its call sign deleted from the Federal Communications Commission's database on July 27, 2011.

External links
Pappas Telecasting Companies official site

Television channels and stations established in 1992
Defunct television stations in the United States
Television channels and stations disestablished in 2011
1992 establishments in California
2011 disestablishments in California
FRE-CA
FRE-CA